Isotenes latitata is a species of moth of the family Tortricidae first described by Józef Razowski in 2013. It is found on Seram Island in Indonesia. The habitat consists of lower montane forests.

The wingspan is about 22 mm. The ground colour of the forewings is whitish, sprinkled and suffused with grey and with rust-brown markings. The hindwings are pale brownish grey.

Etymology
The species name refers to the indistinct differences from Isotenes pityrochroa and is derived from Latin latitata (meaning hiding place).

References

Moths described in 2013
Archipini